The Lookout Girl is a surviving 1928 silent film mystery directed by Dallas M. Fitzgerald and starring Jacqueline Logan.

Cast
Jacqueline Logan - Dixie Evans
Ian Keith - Dean Richardson
William H. Tooker - Dr.
Lee Moran - Pete Mowbray
Gladden James - Bob Conway
Henry Hebert - Sheriff
Jimmy Aubrey - Dean's Valet
Broderick O'Farrell - Banker Hargrave
Jean Huntley - Nurse
Geraldine Leslie - Modiste

References

External links
The Lookout Girl @ IMDb.com

1928 films
American silent feature films
Films based on American novels
American black-and-white films
American mystery films
1928 mystery films
Films directed by Dallas M. Fitzgerald
1920s American films
Silent mystery films